KNEV (95.5 FM) is a commercial radio station located in Reno, Nevada.  KNEV airs a classic hip hop music format branded as "95.5 The Vibe". The station rebroadcasts on translator K257AX at 99.3 FM in Battle Mountain, Nevada.  It is owned by Cumulus Media.  Its studios are located on Plumb Lane in South Reno, and its transmitter is located on McClellan Peak northeast of Carson City, Nevada.

History
KNEV is the longest continuously operating FM station in the state of Nevada, having signed on Christmas Day 1953. Since its original air date in 1953, KNEV has maintained its original call sign and frequency. KNEV was originally an easy listening station during the daytime and classical after 6 p.m. and all day on Sundays and remained that way for many years. In 1980, Everett Cobb sold the station to McClatchy Newspapers. In 1992, the station was relaunched as "Magic 95", with a soft adult contemporary format, and would compete with crosstown station KRNO (Sunny 106.9).

In 1995, the station shifted towards a hot AC format, while retaining the "Magic" branding. The 1970s songs were dropped from the playlist as the station focused on hits from the 1980s and 1990s.

In 2001, KNEV rebranded as "Mix 95.5" and became an adult top 40 station.

In November 2004, the station flipped to an all-Christmas format and brought back the "Magic" branding. On December 26, the station adopted a mainstream adult contemporary format.

On October 7, 2015, at 5 p.m., KNEV flipped to classic hip hop as "95.5 The Vibe". The change came after a brief 15 minute stunt of Christmas music after "Magic" signed off with "Celebration" by Kool and the Gang.

References

External links
Official Website

NEV
Classic hip hop radio stations in the United States
Cumulus Media radio stations
Radio stations established in 1953
1953 establishments in Nevada